Gazi Umur Bey monument is a statue in Birgi, Turkey.

Currently, Birgi is a small town in Ödemiş ilçe (district) of İzmir Province. But it was an important city in the middle ages and it was the capital of the Aydınids in the early 14th century. Umur of Aydın (r.1334-1348) was the second bey of the Aydınıds and was one of the earliest seamen of Turkish history.  His epithet Gazi (Ghazi) means veteran.

His statue was erected in 2008 next to the Birgi Grand Mosque. It was commissioned by the (now abolished) municipality of Birgi and İzmir branch of Turkish Naval Forces. It was also sponsored by the Ministry of Culture and Tourism. Its creator was Eray Okkan.

References

Ödemiş District
Buildings and structures in İzmir Province
Cultural infrastructure completed in 2008
Aydınids
Sculptures of men in Turkey
Monuments and memorials in İzmir